Museum of New Art, Pärnu is an art museum / art gallery in Pärnu, Estonia. Museum's director is Mark Soosaar.

The museum was established in 1992 as Chaplin's Art Centre. In 1998, the museum was renamed.

One of the most notable exhibition is the act exhibition "Mees ja naine" (Man and Woman).

The museum has a collection of over 2000 archival units. The collection's main expert is Edward Lucie-Smith.

References

External links
 

Art museums and galleries in Estonia
Pärnu